Konstantin Alekseyevich Avksentevsky (October 12, 1890 – November 2, 1941) was a Soviet army commander. He fought in the Imperial Russian Army during World War I and for the Bolsheviks in the subsequent civil war. He was a recipient of the Order of the Red Banner. He commanded forces in both Central Asia and the Caucasus.

In July 1938 - February 1939 he was imprisoned in Ukhtpechlag. In June 1939, the criminal case was dismissed. He then worked as an inspector of the cultural and educational part of the farm "Novy Bor" at the mouth of the Pechora River. 
According to official data, he died on November 2, 1941 in the village Medvezhka in the Ust-Tsilemsky District. According to other sources, in November 1941 he was already in Moscow and he was killed when criminals attempted to rob his apartment.
He was buried in Vologda, on the Vvedensky cemetery.

References

1890 births
1941 deaths
People from Babushkinsky District, Vologda Oblast
People from Totemsky Uyezd
Russian military personnel of World War I
Soviet military personnel of the Russian Civil War
Recipients of the Order of the Red Banner